László Bodrogi (born 11 December 1976 in Budapest, Hungary) is a former Hungarian and French professional road bicycle racer, specializing in the individual time trial.

Biography 

László was born in 1976 in Budapest, Hungary. His father, László Bodrogi, managed his career from his childhood.

Early success in Hungary 

In the nineties, Hungarian bicycle manufacturer Schwinn-Csepel (successor of Csepel) was his main sponsor. In turn, he was the main athlete of the company. Among other products, he tested and raced the Schwinn-Csepel magnesium alloy road frame. He competed in various Hungarian teams, including FTC (1991), BVSC-Intertraverz (1992), KSI (1993) and Stollwerck-FTC (1994).

Moving to France 

In 1995, after his father got a job as a doctor in France, László settled down in France and started training in the AC Bisontine team. He quit his university studies to devote his life to his sports career. After a fruitful season in 1996, he was invited to VC Lyon (VC Vaux-en-Velin), the youth team of Festina. After Festina was shaken by the doping scandals of the Tour de France, Laszlo got little attention from the team. He moved on to CC Étupes in 1999.

Professional career 

In 2007, he scored the best result of the Hungarian cycling history by winning the silver medal in the same discipline after Fabian Cancellara.

He raced in the Tour de France in 2005 and finished in 119th place. At the time, he was the only Hungarian cyclist to have participated in the Tour.

After gaining French citizenship in 2008, he rides for France now. 
Consequently, he resigned from participating in the Hungarian championship. Between 1997 and 2008, he won the national road champion title three and the individual time trial champion title ten times.

He suffered a leg injury at the Tour of Germany in 2008, resulting in an 8-month recovery period. After Credit Agricole ceased sponsoring its cycling team, László joined the Katusha team. In 2010, he started preparing for the world championship, although the riders are not qualified yet.

He lives with his family in Ney. He is married to a French woman, Catherine, and has two children.

Career achievements

Major results

1996
 1st  Road race, National Road Championships
 1st Stage 4 Tour of Hungary
 2nd Chrono des Nations Espoirs
1997
 National Road Championships
1st  Time trial
3rd Road race
 2nd  Time trial, UCI Under-23 Road World Championships
 2nd Paris–Roubaix Espoirs
 2nd Chrono des Nations Espoirs
 4th Time trial, European Under-23 Road Championships
1998
 National Road Championships
1st  Time trial
2nd Road race
 1st Chrono Champenois
 3rd Time trial, European Under-23 Road Championships
 5th Time trial, UCI Under-23 Road World Championships
1999
 4th Chrono des Herbiers
2000
 National Road Championships
1st  Road race
1st  Time trial
 1st Duo Normand (with Daniele Nardello)
 1st Prologue Tour de Slovénie
 1st Stage 5 Tour de Normandie
 1st Prologue Vuelta a Argentina
 3rd  Time trial, UCI Road World Championships
 3rd Chrono des Herbiers
 3rd Grand Prix des Nations
 9th Overall Circuit Franco-Belge
2001
 1st  Time trial, National Road Championships
 1st  Overall Volta ao Alentejo
1st Stage 5 (ITT)
 1st  Overall Giro della Liguria
1st Stage 3
 1st Stages 3 & 7 (ITT) Tour de l'Avenir
 1st Stage 4 Tour of Sweden
 2nd Chrono des Herbiers
 2nd Grand Prix des Nations
 5th Josef Voegeli Memorial
 5th Time trial, UCI Road World Championships
2002
 1st  Time trial, National Road Championships
 1st Eddy Merckx Grand Prix  (with Fabian Cancellara)
 1st Prologue Paris–Nice
 2nd Dwars door Vlaanderen
 2nd Grand Prix des Nations
 2nd Memorial Fausto Coppi
 3rd Overall Danmark Rundt
1st Stage 4b (ITT)
 4th Time trial, UCI Road World Championships
 4th Chrono des Herbiers
 4th GP de Fourmies
 6th Overall Driedaagse van De Panne
2003
 1st  Time trial, National Road Championships
 2nd Paris–Brussels
 2nd Eddy Merckx Grand Prix
 4th Ronde van Midden-Zeeland
 5th Grand Prix des Nations
 6th Chrono des Herbiers
2004
 1st  Time trial, National Road Championships
 1st Stage 3b Three Days of De Panne
 9th Overall Ronde van Nederland
2005
 1st  Overall Tour de Luxembourg
 2nd Tour de Vendée
2006
 National Road Championships
1st  Road race
1st  Time trial
 1st Stage 6 Tour of Austria
2007
 National Road Championships
1st  Time trial
2nd Road race
 1st Chrono des Herbiers
 2nd  Time trial, UCI Road World Championships
 7th Tour du Doubs
 10th Polynormande
2008
 1st  Time trial, National Road Championships
 2nd Overall Volta ao Distrito de Santarém
2010
 3rd Time trial, French National Road Championships
2011
 4th Duo Normand
 5th Paris–Tours
 5th Time trial, French National Road Championships
 6th Chrono des Nations
 8th Overall Circuit Cycliste Sarthe
2012
 3rd Overall Tour du Poitou-Charentes
 4th Time trial, French National Road Championships
 5th Chrono des Nations
 7th Classic Loire Atlantique
 10th Overall Paris–Corrèze

Grand Tour general classification results timeline

References

External links 
His former home page in archive.org
Official profile – Katusha Team
Profile – Katusha Team Blog
Profile at Crédit Agricole official website  
Profile – Cyclingnews.com
Results – Cyclingarchives.com

1976 births
Living people
Cyclists at the 1996 Summer Olympics
Cyclists at the 2004 Summer Olympics
Cyclists at the 2008 Summer Olympics
Olympic cyclists of Hungary
Cyclists from Budapest
French male cyclists
Hungarian male cyclists